Terry Wanzek (born March 28, 1957) is an American politician. He is a member of the North Dakota State Senate from the 29th District, serving since 2007. He is a member of the Republican party. He also served in the Senate from 1995 to 2003, and in the House of Representatives from 1992 to 1994.

References

Living people
1957 births
Presidents pro tempore of the North Dakota Senate
Republican Party North Dakota state senators
People from Jamestown, North Dakota
University of Jamestown alumni
21st-century American politicians